Poupeville Airfield is a former World War II airfield, located 1.7 km southeast of Saint-Jean-de-Daye in the Normandy region, France.   It was the first airfield established by the United States Army Air Forces in France, being constructed on D-Day, 6 June 1944.

History
Consisting of nothing more than a sod 2000' emergency landing strip hastily built by IX Engineering Command on D-Day, the airfield served as the first safe location for Allied aircraft having to make an emergency landing on the beachhead.  It was only intended for landings, and not for takeoffs.
Brigadier-General Pete Quesada flew to Normandy on D+2 arriving on Landing Strip 1, nearly killing an engineer who was still finishing off the airfield.

According to the IX Engineer Command website it is not known when the airstrip was released back to its owners.

References
 Johnson, David C. (1988), U.S. Army Air Forces Continental Airfields (ETO), D-Day to V-E Day; Research Division, USAF Historical Research Center, Maxwell AFB, Alabama.
 Holland, James. (2019), Normandy 44 D-Day and the battle for France.
 IX Engineer Command ETO Airfields
  ELS Poupeville

External links

World War II airfields in France
Airfields of the United States Army Air Forces in France
Airports established in 1944